Agnes of Limburg-Styrum (18 September 1563 at Castle de Wildenborch in Bronckhorst – 2 January 1645 in Vreden) was abbess of the abbeys at Elten, Vreden. Borghorst, and Freckenhorst.

Life 
She came from a noble Limburg-Styrum family.  Her father was Herman George of Limburg-Bronkhorst, Lord of Styrum, Wisch and Borculo.  Her mother was Countess Mary of Hoya-Bruchhausen. Her sister Metta was also Abbess in Freckenhorst.

She entered the convent in Elten at a young age.  She became provost in Vreden in 1596.  In 1603, she became abbess of Elten.  From 1614, she was abbess of the abbeys at Vreden, Borghorst and Freckenhorst.  She lived mostly in Vreden.

All four abbeys were in a bad state at the beginning of her reign.  Some were suffering from the aftermath of recent wars; in other, life had become too worldly.  Agnes implemented reforms in all her abbeys.  In Elten, she had the partially ruined building demolished and began building a new one.  In Borghorst, she added a new building.

In 1619, she created the "passion cloth" of Vreden.  It shows eleven images relation to the Passion.  In the center there is a painting of the Crucifixion.  It contains a reference to Agnes: Agnes, by the grace of God abbess of Vreden, Freckenhorst and Borghorst, Countess of Limburg and Bronckhors, had made this ornament in honor of Christ's suffering and donated it to the Church of St. Felicitas in the year of our Lord 1619.  It also contains 16 coats of arms of her ancestors.

During the later part of her life, the Thirty Years' War ravaged the country.  She had family ties in both the Protestant and the Catholic camps; this enabled her to prevent several raids in the area.  With various measures, they tried to prevent the arrival of foreign soldiers.  When necessary, the refused to obey orders from the government of the Bishopric of Münster.  For example, at one point she prevented the arrest of an Anabaptist miller, because the arrest warrant from Münster violated the sovereign rights of her abbey.

She died in 1645 and was buried in the Collegiate Church of Vreden.

References 
Wilhelm Kohl: Die Bistümer der Kirchenprovinz Köln. Das Bistum Münster III. Das (freiweltliche) Damenstift Freckenhorst, in the series Germania sacra, new series, vol.10, Berlin, 1965, p. 347 ff

External links 
  Biography at lwl.org

Footnotes 

House of Limburg-Stirum
German Roman Catholic abbesses
1563 births
1645 deaths
German countesses
16th-century German Roman Catholic nuns
17th-century German Roman Catholic nuns